Gymnothorax odishi is a species of fish from the genus Gymnothorax. Nearly a dozen specimens were caught off India's east coast. The species is distinguishable due to its dark-rimmed jaw pores, brown color, a little dark blotch situated at the back of the eye, and dark-rimmed gill openings. The species has around 133–138 vertebrae.

References 

Fish described in 2018
odishi